Levín is a market town in Litoměřice District in the Ústí nad Labem Region of the Czech Republic. It has about 100 inhabitants.

Administrative parts
The village of Horní Vysoké is an administrative part of Levín.

Notable people
Wilfried Hanke (1901–?), violinist

References

Populated places in Litoměřice District
Market towns in the Czech Republic